The year 1761 in architecture involved some significant architectural events and new buildings.

Events
Robert Adam and Sir William Chambers are jointly appointed Architect of the King's Works to King George III of Great Britain.

Buildings and structures

Buildings completed

Aina Mahal in Bhuj, Gujarat, India, built by Rao Lakhpatji.
Christ Church (Cambridge, Massachusetts), designed by Peter Harrison, is completed.
St. George Church, Moldavia, with a 99-foot (30-m) high bell tower once gilded in 18-carat gold.
Penicuik House in Scotland built by Sir James Clerk, 3rd Baronet.
Dunmore Pineapple in Scotland built.
Église Saint-Georges de Châtenois completed

Births
June 7 – John Rennie the Elder, Scottish-born civil engineer (died 1821)
August 19 – Andreyan Zakharov, Russian architect of the "Empire" style (died 1811)
August 30 (bapt.) – Archibald Elliot, Scottish architect (died 1823)

Deaths
April 7 – Gabriele Valvassori, Italian architect (born 1683)
date unknown – Domenico Cachia, Maltese master builder (born c. 1690)

References

Architecture
Years in architecture
18th-century architecture